The Bayer designations p Puppis and P Puppis are distinct. Due to technical limitations, both designations link here. For the star

p Puppis, see HD 60863
P Puppis, see HD 63922

See also
π Puppis
ρ Puppis
PT Puppis
PU Puppis

Puppis, p
Puppis